Two ships of the Commonwealth and Dominion Line, later the Port Line, have been named SS Port Nicholson, the former name of Wellington Harbour:

 was a cargo ship built in 1912 as Makarini, acquired by Commonwealth and Dominion in 1914, renamed Port Nicholson in 1916 and sunk by a mine in 1917.
, a cargo ship of Commonwealth and Dominion Line, launched in 1918 and torpedoed and sunk in 1942.

See also
, a cargo ship of the Port Line, built in 1962 and scrapped in 1979.

Ship names